Paul Annacone and Christo van Rensburg were the defending champions. Annacone participated with John Fitzgerald, and lost in the quarterfinals to Scott Davis and David Pate, while Van Rensburg played with Kevin Curren, and lost in the semifinals to Grant Connell and Glenn Michibata.Rick Leach and Jim Pugh defeated Connell and Michibata 3–6, 6–4, 6–2, in the final.

Seeds
All seeds receive a bye into the second round. 

  Pieter Aldrich /  Danie Visser (quarterfinals)
  Rick Leach /  Jim Pugh (champions)
  Paul Annacone /  John Fitzgerald (quarterfinals)
  Kevin Curren /  Christo van Rensburg (semifinals)
  Scott Davis /  David Pate (semifinals)
  Darren Cahill /  Mark Kratzmann (second round)
  Jim Courier /  Pete Sampras (second round)
  Grant Connell /  Glenn Michibata (final)

Draw

Finals

Top half

Bottom half

References
General

1990,Doubles
1990 ATP Tour